General Sir David William Fraser,  (30 December 1920 – 15 July 2012) was a senior British Army officer who served as Commandant of the Royal College of Defence Studies from 1978 until his retirement from military service in 1980. He was also a prolific author, publishing over 20 books mostly focused on the history of the Second World War.

Early life
Fraser was born on 30 December 1920. He was the son of Brigadier William Fraser, the younger son of the 19th Lord Saltoun, and Pamela Maude, widow of Billy Congreve a Victoria Cross recipient and daughter of actors Cyril Maude and Winifred Emery. He was educated at Eton College. He left school to join the British Army but was refused. Instead, in January 1940, he matriculated at Christ Church, Oxford.

Military career
While studying at the University of Oxford, Fraser joined the Home Defence Force. In October 1940, he was training at the Guards' Depot in Caterham, Surrey. He was streamlined during training before taking an intensive four-month course at the Royal Military Academy Sandhurst. He was commissioned into the Grenadier Guards as a second lieutenant on 4 April 1941. He was given the service number 184424. His first posting was as a troop commander in the 2nd Battalion, 5th Guards Armoured Brigade, part of the Guards Armoured Division. In the last two years of the Second World War, he was involved in the North West Europe Campaign. He finished the war as a war substantive lieutenant.

On 27 February 1946, Fraser's promotion to lieutenant was confirmed with seniority from 30 June 1943. On 30 December 1947, he was promoted to captain. He served as a company commander in the 3rd Battalion, Grenadier Guards in the Malayan Emergency of 1948. Having attended Staff College, he was promoted to major on 30 December 1954. He was involved in the Suez Crisis in 1956 and the Cyprus Emergency in 1958. He was made a brevet lieutenant-colonel on 1 July 1959. On 6 June 1960, he was promoted to that rank.

Appointed an Officer of the Order of the British Empire in 1962, Fraser was posted to the Ministry of Defence as Director of Defence Policy (Army) from December 1966 until 1969. He was appointed General Officer Commanding 4th Division in 1969, and Assistant Chief of Defence Staff (Policy) in 1971. He was Vice Chief of the General Staff from April 1973, and was knighted as a Knight Commander of the Order of the Bath later that year. He went on to be UK Military Representative to NATO in 1975, and Commandant of the Royal College of Defence Studies in 1978 before retiring in 1980. He had been advanced to Knight Grand Cross of the Order of the Bath just prior to his retirement.

Later life
Fraser was president of the Society for Army Historical Research from 1980 to 1993.

Personal life
In 1947 he married Anne Balfour-Fraser but they divorced in 1952; they had one daughter (Antonia Isabella Fraser). In 1957 he married Julia Frances Oldridge de la Hey; they had two sons (Alexander James Fraser and Simon William Fraser) and two daughters (Lucy Caroline Fraser and Arabella Katherine Fraser).

Books
He was the author of the following books:
 Knight's Cross: A Life of Field Marshal Erwin Rommel
 Frederick the Great: King of Prussia
 And We Shall Shock Them: British Army in the Second World War
 Alanbrooke
 The Grenadier Guards (Men at Arms Series, 73)
 Fairest Isle: BBC Radio 3 Book of British Music
 The Fortunes of War
 The Christian Watt Papers
 Wales in History: The Defenders, 1066–1485 Bk. 2
 Codename Mercury (Hardrow Chronicles)
 Around the House
 Wars and Shadows : Memoirs of General Sir David Fraser
 A Candle for Judas (Treason in Arms)
 Dragon's Teeth (Treason in Arms)
 The Pain of Winning (Hardrow Chronicles)
 Imperatives for Defence (Policy challenge), 1990
 Adam Hardrow (Hardrow Chronicles)
 Adam in the Breach (Hardrow Chronicles)
 The Killing Times (Treason in Arms)
 The Seizure (Treason in Arms)
 Wellington and the Waterloo Campaign (Wellington Lectures), March 1996
 August 1988
 To War with Whitaker: Wartime Diaries of the Countess of Ranfurly, 1939–45, (Reed Audio) with Hermione, Countess of Ranfurly, and Imogen Stubbs (Audio Cassette, 1995)
 Kiss for the Enemy (Thorndike Large Print Popular Series)

References

External links
Find a Grave

|-

|-

|-

1920 births
2012 deaths
Military personnel from Surrey
Burials in Hampshire
Alumni of Christ Church, Oxford
British Army generals
British Army personnel of World War II
British Army personnel of the Malayan Emergency
British military writers
British military personnel of the Suez Crisis
Graduates of the Royal Military College, Sandhurst
Graduates of the Staff College, Camberley
Grenadier Guards officers
Historians of World War II
Knights Grand Cross of the Order of the Bath
Officers of the Order of the British Empire
People educated at Eton College
British expatriates in Cyprus
British Home Guard soldiers